The Nativity is a 2010 British four-part drama television series. The series is a re-telling of the Nativity of Jesus and was broadcast on BBC One and BBC HD across four days, starting on 20 December 2010. It was rebroadcast in two hour-long parts on the mornings of 24 and 25 December 2011 and across four days starting on 19 December 2016.

The series stars Tatiana Maslany as Mary; Andrew Buchan as Joseph; Neil Dudgeon as Joachim; Claudie Blakley as Anna; Peter Capaldi as Balthasar; and John Lynch as Gabriel.

Cast
Tatiana Maslany as Mary
Andrew Buchan as Joseph
Neil Dudgeon as Joachim
Peter Capaldi as Balthasar
John Lynch as Gabriel
Claudie Blakley as Anne
Gawn Grainger as Levi
Obi Abili as Gaspar
Jack Shepherd as Melchior
Al Weaver as Thomas
Ruth Negga as Leah
Howard Samuels as Tax Collector
Ken Bones as Bethlehem Rabbi
Frances Barber as Elizabeth
Art Malik as Nicholas
Vincent Regan as Herod
David Sterne as Abimael
Sadie Shimmin as Salome
Helen Schlesinger as Rachel
Matthew Deslippe as Innkeeper

Production
Tony Jordan started writing the script in 2007. At the time, he did not believe in the Nativity story, but said that since writing The Nativity, his opinion changed. He was asked to produce the series after discussing new projects with BBC Wales in Cardiff, but his meeting got mixed up with another, where they wanted to create a follow up to The Passion. Jordan was asked what he would do with the Nativity and he pitched what he called a "ridiculous notion" of a story centred on the Inn in Bethlehem, which he compared to the BBC 1980s sitcom 'Allo 'Allo!. Jordan forgot about the idea but received a telephone call from the BBC a week later asking him to produce a script.

Filming lasted a month and took place in Ouarzazate, Morocco. Capaldi, Shepherd and Abili almost missed filming due to air travel disruption after the 2010 eruptions of Eyjafjallajökull in Iceland.

Reception
The first episode was watched by 5.21 million viewers, an audience share of 20.3%.

Sam Wollaston of The Guardian praised the series, saying: "[W]hat is nice about this new telling of an old story: it will resonate, and it's relevant. It's very human, too, because that's what it's about, the characters and what happens to them and between them, rather than the message. In short, it's not preachy, and that's a relief."

See also
 List of Christmas films

References

External links
 
 The Nativity at Temple Street Productions
 

2010 British television series debuts
2010 British television series endings
2010s British drama television series
2010 Canadian television series debuts
2010 Canadian television series endings
2010s Canadian drama television series
BBC television dramas
Nativity of Jesus on television
English-language television shows
Television series by Temple Street Productions